Dan Lepard (born 1964) is an Australian baker, food writer, photographer, television presenter and celebrity chef. He was previously a fashion photographer working for Italian Vogue before changing careers age 27, and is today known for reconciling historical methods with innovation in baking.

Biography 
In 1992 Dan became a pastry chef for Alastair Little in Soho, London even though he had no formal training. He then worked for David Hockney as a chef in both London and Los Angeles.

He started working as a baker and consultant at Baker & Spice Bakery in 1997. At his time at Baker & Spice he worked with Sami Tamimi (chef), Yotam Ottolenghi (head pastry chef), and Jim Webb (head viennoiserie chef). Tamimi, Ottolenghi and Webb along with Noam Bar later teamed up to start Ottolenghi's deli's and restaurants, and Dan helped advise the team on the bread for their bakeries.

He has founded bakeries for Fergus Henderson at St John, John Torode at Mezzo, Tony Kitous at Levant and Giorgio Locatelli at Locanda Locatelli and Zafferano.

In 2003, he was the winner of the Outstanding Contribution to London Restaurants at the London Restaurant Awards. In 2012, he created the pop-up bakery The Loaf in a Box in San Sebastián, Spain. It ran from July to September and served as an arena for all those who love bread to debate and eat fantastic produce.
In 2012 UK supermarket chain Sainsbury's launched a baking website with Dan where he has a regular Q&A slot.

Writing career
From September 2005 through to September 2013 he wrote a weekly baking column in The Guardian called How to Bake. His column has been very popular drawing a broad fanbase of eager home bakers. Dan's recipes can also be found on the BBC Food website and he is the baking guru for Mumsnet.com.

He also writes for Waitrose Magazine, Sainsburys Magazine, and Delicious Magazine (UK). In Australia Dan writes for Gourmet Traveller Magazine.

In April 2014 Dan started to write a cookery column for The Sydney Morning Herald and The Age in Melbourne

Television career
In 2013 Dan featured as a judge alongside Kerry Vincent on The Great Australian Bake Off, a cooking television series aired on Nine Network in Australia. This was the first series and is based on the popular British format The Great British Bake Off. In the UK he appears as a guest chef on Channel Four's Sunday Brunch.

Teaching
Dan teaches sourdough masterclasses for the Cookery School at Little Portland Street, London. He frequently gives baking demonstrations, talks and masterclasses throughout the country at a wide range of events and festivals.

Personal life 
He has lived in London since his late teens. In 2012 Dan Lepard entered into a civil partnership with his long-term partner and business manager David Whitehouse.

Bibliography 
Baking with Passion (1999) – winner of the Guild of Food Writers' Cook Book of the Year Award
The Handmade Loaf (2004) – shortlisted for a Guild of Food Writers Award and a World Food Media Award
The Cook's Book: Step-by-step techniques & recipes for success every time from the world's top chefs (2005) – author of the baking section – winner of the James Beard Foundation Book Award
Dictionnaire Universel du Pain (2010) – author of the British section
Exceptional Cakes: Baker & Spice (2007) – co-wrote with Richard Whittington
Exceptional Breads: Baker & Spice (2007) – co-wrote with Richard Whittington
Short and Sweet (2011) – winner of the André Simon Award for Cookbook of the Year
Comptoir Libanais (2013) – co-wrote with Tony Kitous
Comptoir Libanais Express (2014) – co-wrote with Tony Kitous

Photographer 
Made in Italy: Food and Stories (2006) – winner of the Glenfiddich and World Gourmand awards
Hawksmoor at Home: Meat – Seafood – Sides – Breakfasts – Puddings – Cocktails (2011)

References

External links 
 

1964 births
Living people
Australian television chefs
Australian bakers
People from Melbourne